The Women's singles luge competition at the 1968 Winter Olympics in Grenoble was held from 11 to 13 February, at Villard-de-Lans.

After three runs, there were three East German racers Ortrun Enderlein, Anna-Maria Müller and Angela Knösel in the top 4, but were disqualified when the FIL determined that they had been heating their runners, a banned practice. Italian Erika Lechner, third after three runs, was moved into first place, and won gold after the fourth run was cancelled due to bad weather.

West German media alleged race fixing, while GDR sports officials blamed the West German Luge Association for staging the incident.  According to Stasi documents which came to light in 2006, the FIL official that made the decision had allegedly been bribed by the Federal Republic of Germany and Austria to make the allegation. The question of whether the GDR lugers really cheated remains unresolved, with some contemporary media in Germany maintaining that the GDR team were unfairly disqualified.

Results

References

Luge at the 1968 Winter Olympics
1968 in women's sport
Luge